Full-Empty is the fourth album by American alternative rock band Judybats, released in 1994 by Sire Records. It was the band's final album for Sire and the last to feature all three original core members Jeff Heiskell, Johnny Sughrue and Ed Winters.

Background 
Heiskell had intended for the album to be produced by Mitchell Froom and even sent him a demo tape of new songs, but was told by the Judybats' manager that attempts to reach Froom had been fruitless. Instead, the band opted to work with producer Paul Mahern, both because "he was cheap" and "was also supposed to have some kind of indie cachet at that time." While recording Full-Empty, Heiskell eventually received a phone call from Froom, who said he liked the songs and expressed interest in working with the band, only to be told they were already working with Mahern.

Promotion 
The band promoted the album by appearing on Late Night With Conan O'Brien on October 4, 1994, performing "Sorry Counts."

Track listing 
All music by Judybats, lyrics by Jeff Heiskell, except where otherwise indicated.

"What We Lose" – 4:24  	
"Drought" – 3:51
"Happy Song (Settling)" – 3:22 	
"Sorry Counts" – 3:10  	
"Don't Wait for Me" – 3:36 	
"In This Maroon" – 4:40  	
"Wounded Bird" – 3:57  	
"Stupid-Cute" – 3:37	  	
"Jive Talkin'" (Barry Gibb, Robin Gibb, Maurice Gibb) – 3:07  	
"Regret Revisited" – 4:28  	
"Stoned" – 3:37  	
"Liquid" – 3:43  	
"The Cachet of Misery" – 2:44	
"The Lake" – 4:25

Personnel 

Judybats
Jeff Heiskell – lead vocal, backups, Minimoog synthesizer, percussion
Ed Winters – electric guitar, steel & baritone guitar, dobro, Fender Rhodes keyboard, organ & vibes
Johnny Sughrue – acoustic guitar, electric guitar, backup vocals, piano
Paul Noe – bass, dobro, backup vocals
Dave Jenkins – drums

Technical
Paul Mahern – co-producer, engineer
Judybats – co-producers
Ed Thacker – mixing
Mass Giorgini – additional engineering
Mark Hood – additional engineering
Pat Keating – assistant engineer
John Jackson – assistant engineer (mixing)
Stephen Marcussen – mastering
Robin Easter – design (Design Group)
Heather Scarbrough – art direction
John Murphy – photography
Reed Massengill – band photography
Brent – hair & make-up stylist (Salon Visage)
Howard Baybe – wardrobe

References

Judybats albums
1994 albums